Boharyně is a municipality and village in Hradec Králové District in the Hradec Králové Region of the Czech Republic. It has about 600 inhabitants.

Administrative parts
Villages of Budín, Homyle, Trnava and Zvíkov are administrative parts of Boharyně.

References

External links

Villages in Hradec Králové District